Broce may refer to:

 Johans Kristofs Broce, Latvian name of a German pedagogue and ethnographer
 Broce, Croatia, a village near Ston, Croatia